The Jemez River is a tributary of the Rio Grande in eastern Sandoval County, New Mexico, United States.

Description
The river is formed by the confluence of the East Fork Jemez River and San Antonio Creek, which drain a number of tributaries in the area of the Jemez Mountains and Santa Fe National Forest. Both San Antonio Creek and the East Fork Jemez River flow through intricate meanders along their courses. The East Fork Jemez is a National Wild and Scenic River.

The Jemez River flows generally south to join the Rio Grande near Bernalillo, north of Albuquerque.

Course
The main tributaries streams that join to form the Jemez River are San Antonio Creek and the East Fork Jemez River. Both originate on the west side of the Sierra de los Valles near the northwest corner of Los Alamos County. San Antonio Creek flows west in a northward curve, through Valle Toledo and Valle San Antonio. The East Fork Jemez River flows west in a southward curve, through Valle Grande. These valleys are all part of the Valles Caldera. The two tributary streams join near Battleship Rock in Cañon de San Diego, forming the Jemez River's main stem.

The Jemez River flows south through the Cañon de San Diego, between the Jemez Mountains and the Nacimiento Mountains to Jemez Springs, and continues south through the canyon to its confluence with the Rio Guadalupe, near Cañones and Cañon. From there the Jemez River continues south, passing through the Jemez Indian Reservation, where some of its water is diverted into irrigation canals. Vallecito Creek joins the Jemez River near Jemez Pueblo. A few miles to the south the Jemez River enters the Zia Indian Reservation and is joined by the Rio Salado, about four miles upstream from Zia Pueblo. The river's course bends slightly to the southeast and it enters the Santa Ana Indian Reservation, passing by the Santa Ana Pueblo, located at the upper end of the Jemez Canyon Reservoir. The reservoir is created by the Jemez Canyon Dam and is entirely within the Santa Ana Reservation. Below the dam the Jemez River flows about three miles to its confluence with the Rio Grande, a few miles north of Bernalillo.

See also

 List of rivers of New Mexico
 List of tributaries of the Rio Grande

References

External links

Tributaries of the Rio Grande
Rivers of New Mexico
Rivers of Sandoval County, New Mexico
Jemez Mountains
Santa Fe National Forest
Wild and Scenic Rivers of the United States